was a Japanese manga artist.

Biography
Kuwata was born in Suita, Osaka. He started out as a manga artist at the young age of 13, when he created  in 1948.  His turning point came in 1957, when he created  (which was adapted into a tokusatsu TV series in 1959).  Since then, Kuwata devoted himself to creating science fiction/superhero adventures.  His most famous was 8 Man, which he co-created with writer Kazumasa Hirai.

Unfortunately, in 1965, when he was to finish the final issue of 8 Man, he was arrested for possessing a handgun (he had contemplated suicide).  With Kuwata in jail, co-creator Hirai got other manga artists to finish the final issue, but wasn't satisfied with it.  It was published in a manga magazine, but has never before been reprinted.

Nevertheless, Kuwata, released from prison shortly thereafter, continued his manga work well into the 1970s, but also ran into depression and alcoholism.  In 1977, he had an epiphany and converted to Buddhism.  He has since done beautiful art books about the life of Buddha.  He also occasionally got back into manga work, and in 1992, he agreed to do his own version of the final issue of 8 Man, upon being asked by co-creator/friend Kazumasa Hirai.

Kuwata passed away at age 85 in Suita Osaka,

Bibliography
Manga adaptations of TV shows
Moonlight Mask
Batman Shonen King, June 1966
Ultra Seven
The Time Tunnel
The Invaders

See also
 Bat-Manga!: The Secret History of Batman in Japan

References 

 
1935 births
2020 deaths
Manga artists from Osaka Prefecture
People from Suita